James Hunter Bergeson (born March 21, 1961 in Newport Beach, California) is a former water polo player who won the silver medal for the United States at the 1988 Summer Olympics in Seoul, South Korea. In 2002, he was inducted into the USA Water Polo Hall of Fame.

See also
 List of Olympic medalists in water polo (men)

References

External links
 

American male water polo players
Olympic silver medalists for the United States in water polo
Stanford Cardinal men's water polo players
Water polo players at the 1988 Summer Olympics
1961 births
Living people
Sportspeople from Newport Beach, California
Place of birth missing (living people)
Medalists at the 1988 Summer Olympics